Serafino Serrati (18th-century) was an Italian Benedictine monk, who also practiced or taught physical sciences. He appears to have lived in the Badia Fiorentina (Florentine Abbey of monks of the order of Monte Cassino). He is now best remembered because the bacterial genus for a specific gram-negative rod-shaped bacteria called Serratia is named after him in 1819 by the botanist and chemist Bartolomeo Bizio (1791 – 1862) to honor him for his unrecognized invention of a steamboat.

Biography
Information regarding Serafino is limited. Born in the 18th-century in Florence to a respectable family, he appears to have studied physics and botany. He is thought to have been the professor of experimental physics in his monastery.

Among his preferred studies was to find ways to direct the movement of globi areostatici, today in English referred to as hot-air balloons. It is said that his fellow monk Rabatta and Serrati were the first Florentines to become air-bound by globes. In addition, according to a biographer he was the first to apply the force of vapor from lumber to move in water An article by Jouffroy d'Ambrans reported on his barchetto a fuoco (ship on fire).

He was said to have been adept and diligent in his monastic responsibility. One anecdote is that once upon hearing the bells calling the monks to choir as part of the liturgy of the hours, Serrafino would rush over still wearing the apron he was using while at work at some chemical oven. The editor of his letters remarks on his modesty and humility, and dismissal of world fame.

Among his reports published in life are the following nine communications:<ref>
Di osservazioni nella scelta dell'aria infiammabile
Che tratta di una storta a due fuochi per decomporre los spirito di vino in aria infiammabile
Che descrive un modello per formare il globo areostatico di figura conica, senza farvi cucciture accio non perda l'aria ch vi s'introduce
Che spiega la direzione di un globo aereostatico per qualunque parte, e in qualungue altezza 
Rappresentate un bilancia a filo, senza l'attritoSopra di un machina pneumatica a mercurio
Che tratta di un conduttore positivo e negativo de di un elettroforo senza le resine *Chi dimostra un barchetto a fuoco, che con la forza di esso, cammina senza il vento 
Che descrive un forne a reverbero, per l'uso di cuocere il pane.</ref>Regarding observations in the choice of flammable airDescribing a two-burner retort to decompose wine spirit into flammable airWhich describes a model to form an aerostatic globe with a conical shape, without making seams that lose the air that is introduced into itWhat explains the direction of a balloon for any part, and at any heightRepresentation of a flush scale, without frictionAbout a pneumatic machine powered by mercuryDescription of a positive and negative conductor of an electrophore without resins Description of a boat powered by fire, who with that force, moves without wind(power)Describing a reverberating oven, for the use of baking bread''.

Observations
The obscurity of the scientific efforts of Serafino recall the obscurity of Gregor Mendel's observations in the next century. However, Serafino could be considered only be one addition to a long list of Catholic clergy scientists.

Bibliography
All the above bibliographical entry was derived solely from:
Dizionario biografico universale, Volume 5, by Felice Scifoni, Publisher Davide Passagli, Florence (1849); page 38.

References

Year of birth unknown
Year of death unknown
18th-century Italian Christian monks
18th-century Italian scientists
18th-century Italian inventors
Water transport in Italy
People from Florence